Rudolf Raftl (7 February 1911, in Vienna – 5 September 1994) was an Austrian football goalkeeper.

He earned six caps for the Austria national football team and participated in the 1934 FIFA World Cup. After the annexation of Austria by Germany, he earned six caps for the Germany national football team, and participated in the 1938 FIFA World Cup.

Career
 Hertha Wien (1928–1929)
 SK Rapid Wien (1930–1945)
 First Vienna FC 1894 (1946–1948)

References

1911 births
1994 deaths
Footballers from Vienna
Association football goalkeepers
Austrian footballers
Austria international footballers
German footballers
Germany international footballers
SK Rapid Wien players
First Vienna FC players
1934 FIFA World Cup players
1938 FIFA World Cup players
Dual internationalists (football)